FirstGroup plc is a British multi-national transport group, which is based in Aberdeen in the north-east of Scotland. The company operates transport services in the United Kingdom and the Republic of Ireland. It is listed on the London Stock Exchange and is a constituent of the FTSE 250 Index.

History

Origins

FirstGroup originated from the deregulation of bus services in the United Kingdom in 1986, whereby private companies purchased nationalised and municipal bus operators. In September 1986 the Somerset based services of the Bristol Omnibus Company that were rebranded in 1985 as Badgerline were purchased in a management buyout. As Badgerline Group, it expanded through acquisition purchasing other formerly nationalised bus companies in England and Wales.

In January 1989, Grampian Regional Transport, the bus operator in Aberdeen owned by Grampian Regional Council, was privatised in a management buyout led by its then general manager, Moir Lockhead. As GRT Bus Group, it expanded through acquisition purchasing six former nationalised bus companies in England and Scotland. In April 1995, FirstBus was formed through the merger of the Badgerline and GRT Bus Groups, with fleets in England, Wales and Scotland. The former King Street Barracks site in Aberdeen was selected as the headquarters. At the time of the merger, FirstBus had 5,600 buses, 4,000 of which came from Badgerline. Badgerline's Trevor Smallwood became chairman of FirstBus, while GRT head Moir Lockhead became deputy chairman and chief executive.

Expansion
FirstBus continued the policy of growth by acquisition acquiring former council owned operations and companies formerly owned by English, Welsh and Scottish nationalised operators. FirstBus went on to acquire larger urban metropolitan operators by taking advantage of the privatisation of the PTE bus operations and the privatisation of London bus services. FirstBus acquired GM Buses North in Manchester and Strathclyde Buses in Glasgow in 1996, Mainline in South Yorkshire and CentreWest in London in 1997, and Capital Citybus in London in 1998.

The company was renamed FirstGroup in December 1997 after the company moved into railways in February 1996 with the privatisation of British Rail, through a 24.5% shareholding in Great Western Holdings that won the Great Western and North Western franchises, and a 100% shareholding in First Great Eastern that ran the Great Eastern franchise from January 1997. In March 1998, FirstGroup purchased the 75.5% shares in Great Western Holdings it did not already own and rebranded the franchises First Great Western and First North Western.

In September 1998, FirstGroup made its first overseas foray when New World First Bus commenced operating bus services in Hong Kong formerly operated by China Motor Bus. FirstGroup had a 26% shareholding in the joint venture. In May 2000 FirstGroup sold its shares to joint venture partner New World Development. In September 1999, FirstGroup purchased Ryder Public Transport Services, a provider of school bus and contracted public bus transportation in the United States. In May 2000, FirstGroup began operating the London Tramlink concession under contract to Transport for London.

In August 2003, FirstGroup purchased GB Railways which owned Anglia Railways and GB Railfreight and held 80% of the shares in Hull Trains. Having not been shortlisted for the Greater Anglia franchise, this gave FirstGroup another chance to bid. However, it was unsuccessful and the franchise was awarded to National Express from April 2004, including the services operated by First Great Eastern. In November 2003, FirstGroup purchased a 90% shareholding in Irish coach operator Aircoach.

In February 2004, FirstGroup's joint venture with Keolis commenced operating the First TransPennine Express rail franchise, FirstGroup having a 55% shareholding. In April 2004, FirstGroup commenced operating the First Great Western Link franchise and in October 2004 the First ScotRail franchise. In December 2004, the remainder of First North Western passed to Northern Rail, some services having already been transferred to Arriva Trains Wales and FirstTranspennine Express.

In April 2006, FirstGroup commenced operating the First Capital Connect franchise and a renewed First Great Western franchise that had been expanded to include the Thames Trains and Wessex Trains franchises.

In February 2007, FirstGroup agreed to buy the US-based firm Laidlaw, an operator of inter-city coaches and yellow school buses across North America, for £1.9 billion (US$3.7 billion). This also gave it a controlling stake in Greyhound Lines, the largest bus operator in North America. The Greyhound name and the names of Canadian subsidiaries of Greyhound Canada were retained, and all other Laidlaw-owned services in the United States and Canada were rebranded under the First or Greyhound names, except for Voyageur Colonial and Grey Goose in Canada. In January 2009, DSBFirst, FirstGroup's joint venture with Danish State Railways commenced operating the Oresundtrain rail franchise from Helsingør and Nivå in Denmark along the Kystbanen line and over the Øresund Bridge to Malmö, Växjö, Kalmar, Karlskrona and Gothenburg in Sweden. FirstGroup had a 25% shareholding in the Danish business and 20% in the Swedish business. By March 2011 this was 30%.

In June 2009, FirstGroup made a takeover offer for fellow transport operator National Express, which was struggling with debt at the time and was struggling to hold onto its National Express East Coast rail franchise. This was rejected, National Express which said it did not "consider it appropriate" at the time to discuss a takeover. FirstGroup believed that there was "significant industrial and commercial logic" for a merger, but National Express wished to focus on its own initiatives.

Recent years
In June 2010, FirstGroup sold its railfreight business First GBRf to the Eurotunnel Group for £31 million, ending the group's involvement in rail freight transport. In September 2010, former London Underground managing director Tim O'Toole, already a board member since May 2009 and chief operating officer and Deputy Chief Executive since June 2010, was announced as the successor to retiring group chief executive officer Moir Lockhead with effect from 31 March 2011.

In September 2011, FirstGroup's German bus operations were sold to Marwyn European Transport. In December 2011, DSBFirst ceased operating the Swedish part of the operation after difficulties encountered by Danish State Railways over cross subsidies.

In July 2012, First Travel Solutions provided bus and coach services for the London 2012 Olympic Games as First Games Transport. This involved the provision of venue shuttle and park and ride services, services connecting the peripheral park and ride sites on the M25 with the Olympic Park and Ebbsfleet, and a nationwide network of express coaches to the Olympic Park and the Weymouth and Portland sailing venue. The services required around 900 vehicles in total, although some were sub-contracted. In June 2013, most of the First London bus operations were sold to Go-Ahead London, Metroline and Tower Transit. In April 2015 FirstGroup was unsuccessful in bidding for the ScotRail franchise, which is now run by Abellio ScotRail. In December 2015, FirstGroup was awarded the next TransPennine Express franchise. The new franchise commenced on 1 April 2016 with a commitment to introduce new trains, routes and faster journey times.

In October 2016, First Transit commenced operating the A-train under contract to the Denton County Transportation Authority, its first rail operation in the United States. In August 2017 FirstGroup's joint venture with MTR Corporation commenced operating the South Western franchise, FirstGroup having a 70% shareholding in South Western Railway.

In May 2019, FirstGroup announced it would sell its UK bus operations. The only sales completed were parts of First Greater Manchester to the Go-Ahead Group and Rotala. In May 2020, FirstGroup announced it would retain its UK bus operations and sell its North American assets instead.

In April 2021, FirstGroup agreed terms to sell the First Student and First Transit businesses to EQT Partners. The sale completed later in 2021.

In October 2021, FirstGroup announced the sale of Greyhound Lines to FlixMobility, completing its stated strategy to focus on its leading UK public transport businesses. In October 2021, Lumo commenced operating services on the East Coast Main Line.

In June 2022, FirstGroup rejected a £1.2bn takeover proposal from a US private equity bidder.

In February 2023, FirstGroup announced that subject to regulatory approval, it would purchase both the bus services and bus dealer operations of Purfleet-based Ensignbus.

Operations

FirstGroup is Britain's largest bus operator, running more than 20% of all local bus services. A fleet of nearly 9,000 buses carries some 2.9 million passengers a day in more than 40 major towns and cities. FirstGroup also runs passenger rail services in the UK. Passenger rail franchises consist of Avanti West Coast, Great Western Railway, South Western Railway and TransPennine Express. It also runs two non-franchised open access passenger operations - Hull Trains and Lumo. FirstGroup operates tram services on the London Tramlink network carrying approximately 24 million passengers a year on behalf of Transport for London.

FirstGroup owns and operates the Aircoach service in Dublin, linking Dublin Airport with the city centre, the south side of Dublin, Greystones and Bray as well as long-distance express services runs to Cork and Belfast.

Corporate branding and liveries

FirstGroup has always had a consistent brand and uses the First brand for most of its operations. FirstBus began to apply a standard corporate typeface to its fleet names in the late 1990s, introducing the stylized f logo depicting a road. A corporate white, pink and blue livery nicknamed "Barbie" was introduced to new buses, while further bus company acquisitions continued. Inherited bus fleets were initially left in their original colours with First fleet names, with the intention that the Barbie scheme would stand for a set service quality. Later older buses received a modified "Barbie 2" livery.

As part of its corporate branding, First subsequently removed all local branding for its bus services, buses simply carried the 'First' brand, although each company still operated independently. In 2012, the group began to introduce a new purple, white and lilac livery to its bus fleets, which also reinstated local branding. In January 2014, the company rebranded its First Somerset & Avon operations in Bridgwater and Taunton as The Buses of Somerset, using a two-tone green livery.

Hull Trains carries a predominantly blue livery, including white, pink and purple. This was also used by First Great Western until 20 September 2015, when the franchise was rebranded as Great Western Railway, with a new logo and dark green livery paying homage to the original Great Western Railway.

London Tramlink operations are painted in white, green and blue as per Transport for London requirements. In Scotland, First ScotRail operated with a blue livery with white saltire markings on the carriage ends, as mandated by the Scottish Government's transport agency Transport Scotland.

Current operating businesses
Current operating businesses include:

Bus and coach

United Kingdom

Scotland
First Aberdeen (formerly First Grampian)
First Aberdeen Coach Hire (formerly Grampian Executive)
First Glasgow (formerly First Kelvin and First Greater Glasgow)
First West Lothian - Sold to McGill's Bus Services (September 2022)
First Bluebird - Sold to McGill's Bus Services (September 2022)

England
First Berkshire & The Thames Valley (formerly First Beeline)

First Eastern Counties

First Essex (formerly First Eastern National, First Thamesway)

First Greater Manchester

First Hampshire & Dorset

First South Yorkshire & Midlands consists of:
First Leicester
First Worcestershire (sometimes referred to as First Wyvern)
First Potteries (operating in Staffordshire and South Cheshire, formerly First PMT/PMT Limited) 

First South Yorkshire (formerly First Mainline)

First South West (formerly First Devon & Cornwall)
Kernow
Buses of Somerset

First West of England (formerly First Bristol & First Somerset & Avon)

First West Yorkshire consists of:
First Bradford
First Halifax, Calder Valley & Huddersfield
First Leeds
First York (including the York Park & Ride)

Wales
First Cymru

Other operations
First Northern Ireland 

First Travel Solutions re-branded 2016 (Formally First Rail Support) which provides emergency and planned rail replacement transport to train operating companies using First and non-First Transport through its 24-hour control room in Simonstone, Lancashire

Ireland

Aircoach

Rail

United Kingdom

Avanti West Coast (70% shareholding)
Great Western Railway (formerly First Great Western)
Hull Trains
London Tramlink
Lumo
South Western Railway (70% shareholding)
TransPennine Express

Former operating companies

Bus and coach

Canada
Greyhound Canada (intercity bus services)
Grey Goose Bus Lines
Vancouver Island Coach Lines
Voyageur Colonial Bus Lines
First Student (school, charter bus and public transit services)
HandyDART Contract to TransLink (British Columbia) for accessible transit service in Metro Vancouver

Germany
FirstGroup Rhein-Neckar sold September 2011 to Marwyn European Transport

Hong Kong
New World First Bus 26% stake sold May 2000 to New World Development

United Kingdom
First Chester & The Wirral sold to Stagecoach Merseyside & South Lancashire in January 2013
First Northampton ceased 14 September 2013
First Scotland East (formerly First SMT, First Borders and First Midland Bluebird) sold to McGills in September 2022
First London from March 1997 until September 2013, most operations sold to Go-Ahead London, Metroline and Tower Transit, remainder ceased upon expiry of contracts in September 2013
Greyhound UK coach services between September 2009 and December 2015
First Borders (formerly Lowland Scottish and part of the wider First Scotland East group) sold to West Coast Motors, trading as Borders Buses, on 26 March 2017.
First Southampton (also known as First Cityred) ceased trading on 18 February 2023.

United States
Greyhound Lines (intercity bus services)
BoltBus (a discount operator competing with Megabus)
First Student, a school transport provider 
First Transit, a city and county public transport provider 
First Vehicle Services, which maintained vehicles for many corporations, organizations and local governments, including the other First divisions.

Rail

United Kingdom
First Great Eastern from January 1997 until April 2004, incorporated into Greater Anglia franchise subsequently operated by National Express as One
First North Western from March 1997 until December 2004, operations split between Arriva Trains Wales, First TransPennine Express and Northern Rail
First GBRf from August 2003 until sold in June 2010 to Eurotunnel Group, rebranded as GB Railfreight
First Capital Connect from April 2006 until September 2014, succeeded by Govia Thameslink Railway
First ScotRail from October 2004 until March 2015, succeeded by Abellio ScotRail & Caledonian Sleeper
First TransPennine Express (55% shareholding) from February 2004 until March 2016, succeeded by TransPennine Express with FirstGroup having 100% ownership

United States 
A-train, Denton County Transportation Authority commenced October 2016

Denmark and Sweden 
DSBFirst was a joint rail venture with Danish State Railways (30% shareholding) until 2013

References

External links

Bus groups in the United Kingdom
Companies based in Aberdeen
Companies listed on the London Stock Exchange
 
British companies established in 1995
Transport companies established in 1995
Transport operators of the United Kingdom
1995 establishments in Scotland